Easter Fever is a 1980 Canadian-American animated Easter themed television special that premiered in syndication in the United States and on CBC on March 30, 1980.

Production
It is the five out of the six television specials in the 1977 to 1980 series of specials by Nelvana. It was also one of the last television specials from the company, concluding the series with Take Me Up to the Ball Game, which premiered on September 18 of the year.

Summary
In the special, Jack Rabbit (voiced by Saturday Night Live cast member Garrett Morris) leaves his job as the Easter Bunny and is treated to a celebrity roast until an aardvark convinced him not to retire with "the last Easter egg" (Maurice LaMarche providing impressions of Steve Martin and Don Rickles and SCTVs Catherine O'Hara providing the voice of Jack's wife Scarlett O'Hare). It also features songs by John Sebastian of The Lovin' Spoonful.

Voice cast
Garrett Morris as Jack Rabbit
Maurice LaMarche as Don Rattles/Steed Martin
Catherine O'Hara as Scarlett O'Hare
Don Ferguson as Announcer
Jim Henshaw as Aardvark
Chris Wiggins as Santa Claus
Larry Mollin as Ratso Rat
Jeri Craden as Madame Malegg
Melleny Brown as Hare-O

See also
The Dean Martin Celebrity Roast
A Cosmic Christmas
The Devil and Daniel Mouse

References

External links

Easter Fever at Big Cartoon DataBase

1980 television specials
1980s animated television specials
Canadian television specials
Nelvana television specials
Easter television specials
Easter Bunny in television
American television specials
Santa Claus in television